Hoplostethus ravurictus is a member of the family Trachichthyidae It is native to the Eastern Indian Ocean off Australia's western coast where it can be found at depths of between . It can reach sizes of up to  SL.

References

External links
 

ravurictus
Marine fish of Western Australia
Fish described in 2008